The Eleventh Hour Guest (French: L'invité de la onzième heure) is a 1945 French mystery film directed by Maurice Cloche and starring Jean Tissier, Blanchette Brunoy and Roger Pigaut. It was shot at the Billancourt Studios in Paris. The film's sets were designed by the art directors Maurice Colasson and Georges Wakhévitch.

Synopsis
An inventor claims to have invented an incredible new machine which acts as a thought detector amongst other things. On the evening he unveils it to his family and intended wife, tragedy strikes and he is found dead.

Cast
 Jean Tissier as Christophe Berri
 Roger Pigaut as 	Le docteur Rémi Lambert
 Blanchette Brunoy as 	Antoinette Langeais
 Junie Astor as Isabelle Bourgoin
 Lily Baron as 	Olga
 Guillaume de Sax as 	Thomas Bourgoin
 Marcel Delaître as 	Monsieur Sulnac
 André Fouché as Serge
 René Génin as Calixte
 Jean Hébey as Frédéric
 Lily Mounet as 	Madame Sulnac 
 Georgette Tissier as 	La soubrette

References

Bibliography
 Rège, Philippe. Encyclopedia of French Film Directors, Volume 1. Scarecrow Press, 2009.

External links 
 

1945 films
1940s French-language films
1945 mystery films
French mystery films
Films directed by Maurice Cloche
Films shot at Billancourt Studios
1940s French films